Camp Sundown is a summer camp for children with xeroderma pigmentosum. All activities are held after sundown, to ensure that the children are not injured by the ultraviolet radiation from the rays of the sun.

References

External links 
  Camp Sundown

Sundown
Summer camps for children with special needs